The canton of La Ferté-Gaucher is a French former administrative division, located in the arrondissement of Provins, in the Seine-et-Marne département (Île-de-France région). It was disbanded following the French canton reorganisation which came into effect in March 2015. It consisted of 18 communes, which joined the canton of Coulommiers in 2015.

Demographics

Composition 
The canton of La Ferté-Gaucher was composed of 18 communes:

Amillis
La Chapelle-Moutils
Chartronges
Chevru
Choisy-en-Brie
Dagny
La Ferté-Gaucher
Jouy-sur-Morin
Lescherolles
Leudon-en-Brie
Marolles-en-Brie
Meilleray
Montolivet
Saint-Barthélemy
Saint-Mars-Vieux-Maisons
Saint-Martin-des-Champs
Saint-Rémy-la-Vanne
Saint-Siméon

See also
Cantons of the Seine-et-Marne department
Communes of the Seine-et-Marne department

References

Ferte gaucher, La
2015 disestablishments in France
States and territories disestablished in 2015